The Sri Lankan national cricket team toured Zimbabwe in October 1982 and played two first-class matches against the Zimbabwean national cricket team before Zimbabwe was elevated to Test status. In addition, the teams played a two-match series of Limited Overs Internationals (LOI). Sri Lanka were captained by Duleep Mendis and Zimbabwe by John Traicos.

Limited overs series
1st Limited Overs Match

2nd Limited Overs Match

4-day match series

1st match

2nd match

References

1982 in Sri Lankan cricket
1982 in Zimbabwean cricket
October 1982 sports events in Africa
Sri Lankan cricket tours of Zimbabwe
International cricket competitions from 1980–81 to 1985
Zimbabwean cricket from 1980–81 to 1999–2000